Miguelina Hernández Garcia (born 28 March 1998) is a Dominican Republic boxer. She competed in the women's flyweight event at the 2020 Summer Olympics.

References

External links
 

1998 births
Living people
Dominican Republic women boxers
Olympic boxers of the Dominican Republic
Boxers at the 2020 Summer Olympics
Place of birth missing (living people)
Pan American Games medalists in boxing
Pan American Games bronze medalists for the Dominican Republic
Boxers at the 2019 Pan American Games
Medalists at the 2019 Pan American Games
20th-century Dominican Republic women
21st-century Dominican Republic women